Andriy Shtoharenko (15 October 1902 – 15 November 1992) was a Soviet Ukrainian composer and teacher.

Biography
Andriy Shtoharenko was born in the Ukrainian village of Novi Kaidaky (now part of the city of Dnipro). He completed his music studies at the Kharkiv Conservatory in 1936 under S. Bohatyriov. From 1921-30 he worked a teacher of singing in Middle schools. In 1926 he became the director of an accordion ensemble.

In 1944 he became a member of the Communist Party of the Soviet Union. From 1954 he lectured at the Kiev Conservatory. In 1960 he became a professor and in 1968 became the rector of the above-mentioned institution. From 1968 he was the head of the Union of Composers of Ukraine.

As a composer, he was well known within the Soviet Union though his music is rarely performed elsewhere. He was awarded the Stalin Prize for his compositions in 1946 and 1952, and was awarded the prestigious title of People's Artist of the USSR. During his long career, he served in many positions, including Professor of Composition and Director of the Kharkiv Conservatory and later Kiev Conservatory.

Originally graduating as a button-accordion player and again as a composer. He composed in nearly every genre, primarily writing works for orchestra, solo piano, and voice. He also wrote number of film scores. His chamber music, though it comprises only a small part of his output, has been highly praised by critics. Shtoharenko's music shows the influence of Mussorgsky and Borodin in that many of his works tend to be of a programmatic and descriptive nature. Most of Shtoharenko's works deal with political themes glorifying the Communist party. A large section also deal with themes such as World War II  and Friendship of Soviet Peoples.

Important works
 Lenin walks across this planet (1967)
 Cantata to the 800th anniversary of Moscow (1954)
 The Road to October (1977)
 Ode to the Communist Party (1977),
 6 symphonies
 Symphonic Dances (1980)

Awards
 USSR State Prize 1946, 1952
 People's Artist of the USSR 1972
 Hero of Socialist Labour 1982
 Shevchenko National Prize 1974
 Order of Lenin 1960, 1982

References

Further reading 
 Ukrainian Soviet Encyclopedic Dictionary, Kiev, 1987
 Keldysh Yu. V. (ed.) Muzykal'naya Entsyklopedia, Moscow, 1982
 Sadie, Stanley (ed.) The New Grove Dictionary of Music and Musicians. London: Macmillan 1980.

External links
 Armenian Sketches for String Quartet sound-bites and short biography editionsilvertrust.com
 Shtoharenko: Études-Tableaux nos. 1-3 (with Juliana Osinchuk, pianist)
 Штогаренко Андрей Яковлевич (in Russian) warheroes.ru

Some of the information on this page appears on the website of Edition Silvertrust but permission has been granted to copy, distribute and/or modify this document under the terms of the GNU Free Documentation License.

1902 births
1992 deaths
20th-century classical composers
20th-century male musicians
Ukrainian classical composers
Soviet composers
Soviet male composers
Male classical composers
Musicians from Dnipro
Recipients of the Shevchenko National Prize
Ukrainian musicians
Ukrainian composers
Kyiv Conservatory rectors
Academic staff of Kyiv Conservatory